Stuart Alexander Fairchild (born March 17, 1996) is a Taiwanese-American professional baseball outfielder for the Cincinnati Reds of Major League Baseball (MLB). He played college baseball at Wake Forest University. Fairchild was drafted by the Cincinnati Reds in the second round of the 2017 MLB draft. He made his MLB debut with the Arizona Diamondbacks in 2021. He has also played for the Seattle Mariners and San Francisco Giants.

Amateur career
Fairchild attended Seattle Preparatory School in the Capitol Hill district of Seattle, Washington, and played for the school's baseball team. The Seattle Times named him to their All-Area Team in 2014. In 2012 and 2013 he was named All-Metro Teams by The Seattle Times, and in 2013 and 2014 he was an All-State selection by the Washington State Baseball Coaches Association. 

He enrolled at Wake Forest University, and played college baseball for the Wake Forest Demon Deacons. In 2016, he played collegiate summer baseball with the Chatham Anglers of the Cape Cod Baseball League. In 2017, his junior year, he slashed .360/.439/.636 with 17 home runs and 67 RBIs in 63 games. In his college career he was a three-time All-ACC pick and All-American, and batted .334/.424/.541 in 176 starts with 53 doubles, four triples, 27 home runs, 155 RBIs, and 230 hits, and was 47-of-57 in stolen-base attempts.

Professional career

Cincinnati Reds
After the season, the Cincinnati Reds selected Fairchild in the second round, 38th overall, of the 2017 MLB draft, and signed him for a $1,802,800 signing bonus. He was assigned to the rookie-level Billings Mustangs where he batted .304/.393/.412 with three home runs, 23 RBIs, and 12 stolen bases in 56 games.

Fairchild spent 2018 with both the Single-A Dayton Dragons (with whom he earned Midwest League All-Star honors) and the High-A Daytona Tortugas, slashing a combined .264/.344/.407 with nine home runs, 57 RBIs, and 23 stolen bases in 130 games between both clubs. He returned to Daytona to open 2019, and was promoted to the Double-A Chattanooga Lookouts during the season. Over 109 games between both teams, he batted .264/.352/.441 with 12 home runs and 54 RBIs. He played for the Glendale Desert Dogs of the Arizona Fall League after the regular season, batting .353/.405/.471.

Fairchild did not play a minor league game in 2020 due to the cancellation of the minor league season caused by the COVID-19 pandemic.

Arizona Diamondbacks
On August 31, 2020, the Reds traded Fairchild, along with Josh VanMeter, to the Arizona Diamondbacks for relief pitcher Archie Bradley and cash considerations. The Diamondbacks added him to their 40-man roster after the 2020 season. He was assigned to the Triple-A Reno Aces to begin the 2021 season, for whom he batted .295/.385/.564.

Fairchild was promoted to the major leagues for the first time on July 6, 2021. Fairchild made his MLB debut that night as a pinch runner for Stephen Vogt and scored the game winning run after David Peralta’s walk-off hit-by pitch in the bottom of the 9th. The following day, Fairchild notched his first career hit, a line drive single off of Colorado Rockies pitcher Lucas Gilbreath; he had 15 major league at bats for the season. He was designated for assignment on April 19, 2022.

Seattle Mariners
On April 23, 2022, Fairchild was traded to the Seattle Mariners in exchange for cash considerations. For Tacoma, he batted .438/.571/.625 in 16 at bats. He had three hitless at bats for Seattle.  He was designated for assignment on May 12, 2022.

San Francisco Giants
On May 14, 2022, Fairchild was traded to the San Francisco Giants in exchange for infielder Alex Blandino and cash. Fairchild spent 5 games for both the Triple-A Sacramento River Cats and the Giants, going 3-for-16 in 21 plate appearances for Sacramento, and going hitless in 8 plate appearances for San Francisco. On June 4, 2022, Fairchild was designated for assignment by the Giants after Sam Delaplane was added to the roster.

Cincinnati Reds (second stint)
On June 11, 2022, Fairchild was claimed off waivers by the Cincinnati Reds. He hit his first MLB home run off of Luis Severino of the New York Yankees in his first plate appearance for the Reds on July 13. He played in 38 games for the Reds down the stretch, slashing .279/.374/.523 with 5 home runs and 6 RBI.

Fairchild was optioned to the Triple-A Louisville Bats to begin the 2023 season.

References

External links

1996 births
Living people
Arizona Diamondbacks players
Arizona League Diamondbacks players
Baseball players from Seattle
Billings Mustangs players
Chatham Anglers players
Chattanooga Lookouts players
Cincinnati Reds players
Dayton Dragons players
Daytona Tortugas players
Glendale Desert Dogs players
Major League Baseball outfielders
Reno Aces players
San Francisco Giants players
Seattle Mariners players
Tacoma Rainiers players
Wake Forest Demon Deacons baseball players
American sportspeople of Taiwanese descent